The third series of the British historical drama television series Downton Abbey broadcast from 16 September 2012 to 4 November 2012, comprising a total of eight episodes and one Christmas Special episode broadcast on 25 December 2012. The series was broadcast on ITV in the United Kingdom and on PBS in the United States, which supported the production as part of its Masterpiece Classic anthology.

Series overview
Preparations are underway for Mary and Matthew's wedding. Tom and Sybil Branson arrive from Ireland, where they now live, to attend the wedding. Robert (Lord Grantham) learns that the bulk of the family's fortune has been lost due to his impetuous investment in the Grand Trunk Railway. Edith falls for Sir Anthony Strallan, whom Robert discourages from marrying Edith due to his age and crippled arm. At Edith's insistence, Robert gives in and welcomes Sir Anthony, but even though he loves her, Strallan cannot accept that the Grantham family disapprove of the match and at the altar announces that he cannot go through with the wedding, devastating Edith.

Meanwhile, Bates's cellmate plants a small surgical knife in his bedding, but Bates is informed by a fellow prisoner allowing him time to find and hide it. At Downton, Mrs Hughes finds out she may have breast cancer, which only some of the household hear about, causing concern, but the tumour turns out to be benign. Tom Branson and Lady Sybil, now pregnant, return to Downton after Tom is implicated in the burning of an Anglo-Irish aristocrat's house. After Matthew's reluctance to accept an inheritance from Lavinia's recently deceased father and then Robert's reluctance to accept that inheritance as a gift, Matthew and Robert reach a compromise in which Matthew accepts that the inheritance will be used as an investment in the estate, giving Matthew an equal say in how it is run.

Tragedy strikes when Sybil dies from eclampsia shortly after giving birth. Tom, devastated, names his daughter Sybil after his late wife. Bates is released from prison after Anna uncovers evidence clearing him of his wife's murder. Tom becomes the new land agent for the Downton estate at the suggestion of Violet, the Dowager Countess. Barrow and O'Brien have a falling out, after which O'Brien leads Barrow to believe that Jimmy, the new footman, is sexually attracted to him. The family visits Violet's niece Susan, her husband "Shrimpie", the Marquess of Flintshire, and their daughter Rose, in Scotland, accompanied by Matthew and a very pregnant Mary. At Downton, Edna Braithwaite, the new maid, enters Tom's room and kisses him; he asks her to leave and she is eventually dismissed. Mary returns to Downton with Anna and gives birth to the new heir, but Matthew dies in a car crash while driving home from the hospital after seeing his newborn son.

Cast and characters

Main cast

Upstairs
Hugh Bonneville as Robert Crawley, Earl of Grantham
Jessica Brown Findlay as Lady Sybil Crawley
Laura Carmichael as Lady Edith Crawley
Michelle Dockery as Lady Mary Crawley
Elizabeth McGovern as Cora Crawley, Countess of Grantham
Maggie Smith as Violet Crawley, Dowager Countess of Grantham
Dan Stevens as Mr Matthew Crawley
Penelope Wilton as Mrs Isobel Crawley

Downstairs
Jim Carter as Mr Charles Carson; the Butler
Phyllis Logan as Mrs Elsie Hughes; the Housekeeper
Brendan Coyle as Mr John Bates; Lord Grantham's valet
Siobhan Finneran as Sarah O'Brien; Lady Grantham's maid
Joanne Froggatt as Miss Anna Smith; head housemaid
Lesley Nicol as Mrs Beryl Patmore; the cook
Sophie McShera as Daisy Robinson; a kitchen maid
Kevin Doyle as Mr Joseph Molesley; Mr Matthew Crawley's valet
Rob James-Collier as Mr Thomas Barrow; First Footman
Matt Milne as Mr Alfred Nugent
Amy Nuttall as Miss Ethel Parks; a housemaid
Allen Leech as Mr Tom Branson

Episodes

References

External links
 

Downton Abbey series